Gustavo Latronico (born June 24, 1984) is a Uruguayan born football player who currently plays with Club Atletico Bristol. He previously played for C.A Peñarol in the Uruguayan First Division.  He is a midfielder and is currently trialling with Australian A-League club Sydney FC. Despite scoring for Sydney on a pre-season friendly against Penrith Nepean United, Latronico failed to sign with the Harbourside club.

Gustavo has also played 5 games for the Uruguay U17 .

References

1984 births
Living people
Footballers from Montevideo
Uruguayan footballers
Association football midfielders